Steve Jobs is a 2015 American biographical drama film based on the life of Apple co-founder Steve Jobs, directed by Danny Boyle and starring Michael Fassbender in the title role, along with Kate Winslet, Seth Rogen, and Jeff Daniels. Aaron Sorkin wrote the screenplay of the film, inspired by Walter Isaacson's 2011 biography of the same name, as well as interviews conducted by Sorkin.

The story is primarily set in the lead-up to the launches of three key products—the Apple Macintosh, the NeXT Computer, the iMac G3—and focuses on Jobs' technical and personal problems during those times. Initially, it had a limited release in New York City and Los Angeles on October 9, 2015. It opened nationwide in the U.S. on October 23, 2015.

The film received critical praised for its performances, screenplay, editing, and original score. Fassbender, Winslet, and Sorkin received strong notices for their work in the film, including nominations from Academy Awards, Golden Globe Awards, BAFTA, Screen Actors Guild Awards, Critic's Choice Awards, Satellite Awards, London Film Critics' Circle, and Online Film Critics Society, among others.

Winslet won Golden Globe, BAFTA, and London Film Critics' Circle Award for Best Supporting Actress, while Fassbender went on to win Best Actor prizes from Online Film Critics Society, Los Angeles Film Critics Association, Austin Film Critics Association, and Houston Film Critics Society, and was honoured with International Star Award by Palm Springs International Film Festival.

Awards and nominations

Notes

See also
 2015 in film

References

External links
 

Lists of accolades by film